Lutodrilus multivesiculatus is a species of invertebrate in the Lutodrilidae family.

Distribution 
It is endemic to the United States.

References 

Haplotaxida
Fauna of the United States
Taxonomy articles created by Polbot